The Urban Redevelopment Authority (URA) is the national urban planning authority of Singapore, and a statutory board under the Ministry of National Development of the Government of Singapore.

Mission
The authority was established on 1 April 1974, and is of critical importance to the city-state. Singapore is an extremely dense country where land usage is required to be efficient and maximized. The city state is trying to reduce land wastage in the face of land shortage in the area.

URA's responsibilities

Land use planning
URA's main responsibility is land-use planning. URA planners devise both long-term strategic plans, along with medium-term plans, which are reviewed every five to ten years. These plans designate the land use and urban density for the entirety of Singapore. These designations are divided by URA into 55 planning areas.

Development control
It is the responsibility of URA to evaluate and grant planning approval for development projects from the public and private sectors. In approving development applications, the URA states its goal is to foster orderly development conforming to the planning guidelines as stated in the statutory Master Plan and the existing control factors. URA tries to provide quality service when working in partnership with building industry professionals and the general public to foster development.

Urban design
URA is responsible for the urban design of the city. For areas of special interest, such as the Singapore River area, the Orchard Road shopping belt, and the Marina Bay, URA devises specific medium and short-term urban design and land use plans. It also works with other government agencies in enhancing the city's urban design.

Building conservation
Building conservation in Singapore is the responsibility of URA, which issued a Conservation Master Plan in 1989. This plan laid down guidelines and processes for the conservation of culturally and historically significant buildings. More than 7000 buildings in Singapore have been gazetted as conserved buildings.

Land sales
URA also sells land by tender on behalf of the Singapore government to meet demand from private developers. URA deals with tenders for government land and applications to buy reserved land.

Car park management
The URA plays an important role in managing all public car parks outside of Housing Development Board estates. It provides information and services to the public in regard to coupon parking, season parking, and heavy vehicle parking. URA also sets the bylaws to parking infringement and fines.

The URA Centre
In keeping with URA's function as the authority for urban design in Singapore, the URA Centre was conceptualised by URA's in-house architects. Kenzō Tange Associates and Kajima Design Asia Pte Ltd served as design consultants. The building consists of two blocks: a 16-floor tower block, and a 5-floor podium block.

The Singapore City Gallery

The URA maintains a regular and ever updated public urban planning exhibition on the first three floors of their headquarters.  Highlights include three scale models of the island of Singapore, the central region, and the central area.  Special exhibits and models on current projects and developments island-wide are regularly displayed as well.

See also
Development Guide Plan
Urban planning in Singapore
Planning Areas of Singapore

References

History of the Urban Redevelopment Authority

External links
Official Website of Urban Redevelopment Authority

Statutory boards of the Singapore Government
Urban planning in Singapore
1989 establishments in Singapore
Government agencies established in 1989